Currachjaghju is an archaeological site in Corsica. It is located in the commune of Levie.

Archaeological sites in Corsica